Saint Barbara, known in the Eastern Orthodox Church as the Great Martyr Barbara, was an early Christian Lebanese and Greek saint and martyr. Accounts place her in the 3rd century in Heliopolis Phoenicia, present-day Baalbek, Lebanon, and recent discovered texts in the Saida early church archives suggest her maternal grandmother is a descendant from Miye ou Miye village. There is no reference to her in the authentic early Christian writings nor in the original recension of Saint Jerome's martyrology.

Despite the legends detailing her story, the earliest references to her supposed 3rd-century life do not appear until the 7th century, and veneration of her was common, especially in the East, from the 9th century.

Because of doubts about the historicity of her legend, she was removed from the General Roman Calendar in the 1969 revision, though not from the Catholic Church's list of saints.

Saint Barbara is often portrayed with miniature chains and a tower. As one of the Fourteen Holy Helpers, Barbara continues to be a popular saint in modern times, perhaps best known as the patron saint of armourers, artillerymen, military engineers, miners and others who work with explosives because of her legend's association with lightning, and also of mathematicians. A 15th-century French version of her story credits her with thirteen miracles, many of which reflect the security she offered that her devotees would not die before getting to make confession and receiving extreme unction.

Life

According to the hagiographies, Barbara, the daughter of a rich pagan named Dioscorus, was carefully guarded by her father who kept her locked up in a tower in order to preserve her from the outside world. Having secretly become a Christian, she rejected an offer of marriage that she received through her father.

Before going on a journey, her father commanded that a private bath-house be erected for her use near her dwelling, and during his absence, Barbara had three windows put in it, as a symbol of the Holy Trinity, instead of the two originally intended. When her father returned, she acknowledged herself to be a Christian. Dragged before the prefect of the province, Martinianus, who had her cruelly tortured, Barbara held true to her Christian faith. During the night, the dark prison was bathed in light and new miracles occurred. Every morning, her wounds were healed. Torches that were to be used to burn her went out as soon as they came near her. Finally, she was condemned to death by beheading. Her father himself carried out the death sentence. However, as punishment, he was struck by lightning on the way home and his body was consumed by flame. Barbara was buried by a Christian, Valentinus, and her tomb became the site of miracles. This summary omits picturesque details, supplemented from Old French accounts.

According to the Golden Legend, her martyrdom took place on December 4 "in the reign of emperor Maximianus and Prefect Marcien" ( 286–305); the year was given as 267 in the French version edited by Father Harry F. Williams of the Anglican Community of the Resurrection (1975).

Veneration

The name of Saint Barbara was known in Rome in the 7th century; her cult can be traced to the 9th century, at first in the East. Since there is no mention of her in the earlier martyrologies, her historicity is considered doubtful.

Her legend is included in Vincent of Beauvais'  (xii.64) and in later versions of the Golden Legend (and in William Caxton's version of it).

Various versions, which include two surviving mystery plays, differ on the location of her martyrdom, which is variously given as Tuscany, Rome, Antioch, Baalbek, and Nicomedia.

Saint Barbara is one of the Fourteen Holy Helpers. Her association with the lightning that killed her father has caused her to be invoked against lightning and fire; by association with explosions, she is also the patron of artillery and mining.

Her feast, December 4, was introduced in Rome in the 12th century and included in the Tridentine Calendar. In 1729, that date was assigned to the celebration of Saint Peter Chrysologus, reducing that of Saint Barbara to a commemoration in his Mass. In 1969, it was removed from that calendar, because the accounts of her life and martyrdom were judged to be entirely fabulous, lacking clarity even about the place of her martyrdom. However, she is still mentioned in the Roman Martyrology, which, in addition, lists another ten martyr saints named Barbara.

In the 12th century, the relics of Saint Barbara were brought from Constantinople to the St. Michael's Golden-Domed Monastery in Kyiv, where they were kept until the 1930s, when they were transferred to St. Volodymyr's Cathedral in the same city. In November 2012, Patriarch Filaret of The Ukrainian Orthodox Church – Kiev Patriarchate transferred a small part of St. Barbara's relics to St. Andrew Ukrainian Orthodox Cathedral in Bloomingdale, Illinois.

Her feast day for Roman Catholics and most Anglicans is December 4.

In 2022, Barbara was officially added to the Episcopal Church liturgical calendar with a feast day she shares with Catherine of Alexandria, and Margaret of Antioch on 24 November.

Patronage

Saint Barbara is venerated by Catholics who face the danger of sudden and violent death at work. She is invoked against thunder and lightning and all accidents arising from explosions of gunpowder. She became the patron saint of artillerymen, armourers, military engineers, gunsmiths, and anyone else who worked with cannon and explosives. Following the widespread adoption of gunpowder in mining in the 1600s, she was adopted as the patron of miners, tunnellers, and other underground workers. As the geology and mine engineering developed in association with mining, she became patron of these professions.

The Spanish word , the corresponding Italian word , and the obsolete French , signify the powder magazine of a ship or fortress. It was customary to have a statue of Saint Barbara at the magazine to protect the ship or fortress from suddenly exploding. Saint Barbara is the patron of the Italian Navy.

Within the tunnelling industry, as a long-standing tradition, one of the first tasks for each new tunnelling projects is to establish a small shrine to Santa Barbara at the tunnel portal or at the underground junction into long tunnel headings. This is often followed with a dedication and an invocation to Santa Barbara for protection of all who work on the project during the construction period.

In English-speaking countries
The church at HMS Excellent (also known as Whale Island) Portsmouth, Hampshire, England, the former Gunnery School of the Royal Navy, is called St. Barbara's. From 'Britain's Glorious Navy': "On the dining-table in the ward-room at Whale Island, a delightful silver statuette of Saint Barbara, the patron saint of Artillerists, smiles down on successive generations of gunnery officers who will not let her, or the Navy, down. Their job is to get straddles with full-gun salvoes of a reasonable spread; Saint Barbara herself arranges the hits."

Saint Barbara was also the Patron saint of the Royal Army Ordnance Corps of the British Army, a church being dedicated to her initial at Hilsea Barracks Portsmouth later being moved to Backdown in Surrey, when the Corps moved its training establishment there.

The Irish Army venerates her as the patron saint of the Artillery Corps where she appears on the corps insignia, half dressed, holding a harp, sitting on a field cannon.

Saint Barbara's Day, December 4, is celebrated by the British (Royal Artillery, RAF Armourers, Royal Engineers), Royal Navy Fleet Air Arm Armourers, Australian (Royal Regiment of Australian Artillery, RAAF Armourers), Canadian (Explosive Ordnance Disposal Technicians (EOD), Canadian Ammunition Technicians, Canadian Air Force Armourers, Royal Canadian Artillery, Canadian Military Field Engineers, Royal Canadian Navy Weapons Engineering Technicians), and New Zealand (RNZN Gunners Branch, RNZA, Royal New Zealand Army Ordnance Corps, RNZAF Armourers) armed forces. It is celebrated by the Norwich University Artillery Battery with a nighttime fire mission featuring multiple M116 howitzers.

Saint Barbara's Day is celebrated by United States Army and Marine Corps Field and Air Defense Artillery, many Marine Corps Explosive Ordnance Disposal Technicians. The units and sub-units celebrate the day with church parades, sports days, guest nights, cocktail parties, dinners and other activities. Several mining institutions also celebrate it, such as some branches of the Australian Institute of Mining and Metallurgy.

The West Australian Mining Club celebrate Saint Barbara's Day and use it to remember those people who have died working in the mining industry during the year. Although they do not celebrate her saint's day, she is also the patron saint of US Navy and Marine Corps Aviation Ordnancemen.

A 12th-century church in the Worcestershire village of Ashton under Hill is dedicated to Saint Barbara and is still in use to this day.

In the mining town Kalgoorlie, Australia, as patron saint of miners she is venerated in the annual St. Barbara's Day parade.

Central Europe

In Germany,  is the custom of bringing branches into the house on December 4 to bloom on Christmas. Saint Barbara is revered as a patron saint of miners and in extension, the geosciences in general, including the tunneling industry. This connection is particularly strong in the Catholic areas of Germany, as for example Bavaria. Some university geology departments hold annual 'Barabarafests' if not on the 4th then the closest Friday, or within Baden-Württemberg, see University of Tübingen, University of Freiburg or University of Bonn or applied geosciences of the Technische Universität Darmstadt in Hesse.

In the Czech Republic, a statue of Saint Barbara is placed near the future tunnel portal during the groundbreaking ceremony of most major tunneling projects, owing to her being the patron saint of miners.

In Poland, the salt mine at Wieliczka honours Saint Barbara in Saint Kinga's chapel.

In France, due to the historic link between the firefighters and the military sappers, Saint Barbara is also the patron of firefighters and has thus been celebrated by fire services throughout the country on December 4 since the Third Republic.

Spain, Portugal and former colonies
The Spanish military artillerymen, mining engineers and miners also venerate her as patron saint. Parades, masses, dinners and other activities are held in her honour.

A portion of the coast of California, now occupied by the city of Santa Barbara, California and located approximately 100 miles northwest of Los Angeles, is named after her. The City of Santa Barbara got its name from the early Spanish navigator Juan Cabrillo. On December 4, the explorer stopped at a particular place on the California coast. He chose to name the spot after the patron of that day, Saint Barbara. A Roman Catholic missionary church, the Mission Santa Barbara, was founded there on her feast day in 1786, and is one of the twenty-one such churches that were operated by the Franciscan Order and collectively known as the California missions. The Presidio of Santa Barbara was built in 1782, with the mission of defending the Second Military District in Spanish California. Santa Barbara County was one of the twenty-seven original counties of California, formed in 1850 at the time of statehood. The county's territory was later divided to create Ventura County in 1873.

Other Spanish and Portuguese settlements named Santa Barbara were established in Brazil, Chile, Colombia, Honduras, Mexico, Venezuela, and the Philippines. 

In the Afro-Cuban religion of Santería, Barbara is syncretized with Chango, the deity of fire, lightning, and thunder. In Afro-Brazilian religions of Candomblé and Umbanda, she is often identified as Yansan, the orisha of wind and storms.

Eastern Europe, Eastern Orthodox Church
In Ukraine, alleged relics of Saint Barbara are kept in St. Michael's Golden-Domed Monastery. A church of Great-Martyr Barbara of Ukrainian Orthodox Church (Moscow Patriarchate) is located near Kyrylivskyi Hai park in Kyiv. In 2019 the 19th Missile Brigade of the Ukrainian Ground Forces received the honorary title "Saint Barbara".

In Greece, the day is celebrated by the Artillery Corps of the Greek Army and the Cypriot National Guard. Artillery camps throughout the two countries host celebrations in honor of the saint, where the traditional sweet of loukoumades is offered to soldiers and visitors, allegedly because it resembles cannonballs. Saint Barbara is also the patron saint of the northern Greek city of Drama, where a sweet called , which resembles a more liquid form of koliva, is prepared and consumed on her feast day.

Some Macedonians celebrate with their closest family and friends at home, while others refrain, believing that people who step in their house on Saint Barbara's day will give them either good or bad luck for the rest of the year.

In Armenia, a cave shrine to Saint Barbara (Kuys Varvara) is located on the slopes of Mount Ara and lit candles and flower garlands are used as tribute.

Eid il-Burbara or Saint Barbara's day is celebrated in Lebanon, Syria, Jordan and Palestine, Israel among Arab Christians annually on December 4, in a feast day similar to that of North American Halloween. The traditional food for the occasion is Burbara, a bowl of boiled wheat, barley, pomegranate seeds, raisins, anise and sugar. Shredded Coconut, Walnuts or almonds can be added. The general belief among Lebanese Christians is that Saint Barbara disguised herself in numerous characters to elude the Romans who were persecuting her, and the tradition states that when the saint was escaping from the army of the pagan king in Baalbek, she passed in a field of wheat, and the wheat grew miraculously in order to hide her footprints from the soldiers, and this is the reason of serving the traditional wheat dessert on the feast day. In the Christian village of Aboud in the West Bank, there is a shrine in a cave that the saint reportedly took refuge in. It is celebrated on December 17.

Many churches in Russia are dedicated in her name, including one in Moscow, next to Saint Basil's Cathedral, and in Yaroslavl.

The feast of Santa Barbara in Italy
The feast of Santa Barbara is the main religious feast of Paternò, in the province of Catania, dedicated to Santa Barbara, the patron saint of the city, originally from Nicomedia, in Bithynia (current İzmit in Turkey) and martyred according to tradition in 306 by father Dioscuro.

The event takes place annually on December 3, 4, 5 and 11, May 27 and July 27. December 4 represents the date of the martyrdom of the saint, May 27 is the feast of the patronage of Santa Barbara during which the miracle of the stopping of the eruption of Etna in 1780 is remembered, while July 27 is the feast of the arrival of the relics that were brought to Paternò in 1576. The feast of Santa Barbara is one of the most beautiful Catholic feasts in Italy.

The Order of Saint Barbara

The United States Army Field Artillery Association and the United States Army Air Defense Artillery Association maintain the Order of Saint Barbara as an honorary military society of the United States Army Field Artillery and the United States Army Air Defense Artillery. Members of both the United States Army and United States Marine Corps, along with their military and civilian supporters, are eligible for membership.

Cultural legacy

The name of the barbiturate family of pharmaceutical drugs is believed to derive from the suggestion by an artilleryman commemorating the feast of Saint Barbara in 1864, whom the chemist Adolf von Baeyer encountered at a local tavern whilst celebrating his recent discovery of the parent compound.

Saint Barbara is mentioned in Thomas Pynchon's novel Against the Day. The December fourth holiday is compared to the Fourth of July, as being more celebrated by the Dynamiters.

Saint Barbara is mentioned in Federico García Lorca's play La Casa de Bernarda Alba (1936). According to this drama, a popular Spanish phrase regarding this saint in the early 20th century was:Blessed Santa Barbara, /
Your story is written in the sky, /
With paper and holy water.

The first Spanish-language telenovela filmed in color for TV in the US was the 1973 production of Santa Bárbara, Virgen y Mártir, filmed entirely on location in Hialeah, Florida.

G. K. Chesterton wrote the Ballad of Saint Barbara, interweaving the Legend of the Saint with the contemporary account of the huge artillery barrages that turned the First Battle of the Marne.

Major Barbara is a play by George Bernard Shaw in which the title character is an officer in the Salvation Army and grapples with the moral dilemma of whether this Christian denomination should accept donations from her father, who is an armaments manufacturer.

In "Time Bomb," an episode of The Closer, the LAPD deploy a bomb-squad robot named Babs, after St. Barbara in her role as patron saint of artillery and explosives personnel.

Saint Barbara's story is mentioned in a live version of The Hold Steady's song "Don't Let Me Explode" from Lollapalooza.

The original play "Hala and the King" هالة_والملك_(مسرحية) of the Rahbani_brothers starring Fairuz is based on the traditional celebrations of the Saint Barbara Feast in Lebanon, the songs of the first act use the same musical rhyme used by the children until today during the feast, and the concept of costumes in the play is based on the local practices during the feast.

Gallery
Saint Barbara is usually depicted in art as standing by a tower with three windows and two tables with any chair, carrying a palm branch and a chalice, sometimes with cannons depicted by her side.

See also
Barbara (given name)
Barbara's day in Russia
Fourteen Holy Helpers
St. Barbara's Church
Saint Barbara, patron saint archive

References

Further reading

External links

St Barbara statue - St Peter's Square Colonnade Saints
Katarina Sweda - St. Barbara Sculptures
Catholic Forum profile for Saint Barbara
Saint Barbara in Orthodoxy
An image of a 16th-century French sculpture of Saint Barbara, holding a tower
Patron Saints Index: Saint Barbara
"Here Beginneth the Life of St. Barbara" from the Caxton translation of the Golden Legend

3rd-century Christian martyrs
Ante-Nicene Christian female saints
Christian martyrs executed by decapitation
Fourteen Holy Helpers
People whose existence is disputed
Saints from Roman Anatolia
Saints from Roman Egypt
Great Martyrs
Lebanese saints
Anglican saints